Melona (메로나) is a South Korean ice pop, manufactured by Binggrae Co. Ltd. Although the product is called "Melona" and is identified by its melon flavor, the ice pop also comes in other fruit flavors, such as strawberry and coconut. Each 80 ml/2.7 fl oz bar contains 130 kcal of energy .

Popularity and availability
Melona was introduced in 1992. In the first year, it made 21 billion won (approximately 18 million USD) in sales. Melona is generally sold in convenience stores in South Korea. According to data from Family Mart, Melona was its eighth most popular product sold in 2007.

It can also be found in increasing numbers of stores around the world, including in the United States, Canada, Australia, Brazil, Singapore, Malaysia, Paraguay, Philippines, China, Argentina, Chile, Czech Republic, Germany, Vietnam and New Zealand, usually in Asian markets or Korean retail outlets, but also in major retailers like Costco.

Flavors
Honeydew melon
Banana
Mango
Strawberry
Coconut
Purple Yam
In 1997 there was a grape flavor

See also

 List of frozen dessert brands
 List of Korean desserts

References

External links
Melona website
Binggrae's official corporate website
Cool treat bears the flavor of honeydew  Article from the Honolulu Star Bulletin, March 4, 1998
Melona Argentina

South Korean desserts
Brand name frozen desserts